Christine of the Big Tops is a 1926 American silent romantic drama film starring Pauline Garon and Cullen Landis. It is one of the first films of the prolific Warner's director Archie Mayo.

A copy of the film is in the George Eastman House Motion Picture Collection.

Cast
Pauline Garon - Christine
Cullen Landis - Bob Hastings
Otto Mattiesen - Hagan (*as Otto Matieson)
Robert Graves - Pete Barman
John Elliott - Dr. Hastings
Martha Mattox - Mrs. Hastings
Betty Noon - Doris

References

External links
Christine of the Big Tops at IMDb.com

 

1926 films
1926 romantic drama films
American black-and-white films
American romantic drama films
American silent feature films
Circus films
Films directed by Archie Mayo
Films with screenplays by Sonya Levien
1920s American films
Silent romantic drama films
Silent American drama films